Harry Wilkinson (22 March 1903 – 1 October 1988) was an English rugby union footballer who played in the 1920s. He played at representative level for England, and Yorkshire, and at club level for Halifax RUFC, as a flanker, i.e. number 6 or 7, he died in Hastings, New Zealand.

International honours
Harry Wilkinson won caps for England while at Halifax in 1929 against Wales, Ireland, and Scotland, and in 1930 against France.

Genealogical information
Harry Wilkinson was the son of the rugby union footballer; Harry Wilkinson.

References

External links
International Statistics at scrum.com

1903 births
1988 deaths
British & Irish Lions rugby union players from England
England international rugby union players
English rugby union players
Rugby union flankers
Rugby union players from Halifax, West Yorkshire
Yorkshire County RFU players